Marie-Hélène Syre (born 5 March 1958) is a French equestrian. She competed in two events at the 1996 Summer Olympics.

References

External links
 

1958 births
Living people
French female equestrians
French dressage riders
Olympic equestrians of France
Equestrians at the 1996 Summer Olympics
Sportspeople from Rouen
20th-century French women